Tuļļi Lum (Livonian for "hot snow"; often simplified as "Tulli Lum") is an Estonian/Livonian folk music band that was formed in 1999 when the Estonian ensemble found Livonian Julgī Stalte, originally from Riga, Latvia, while she was studying music in Estonia.

The basis of much of the group's works are the books of the Estonian folklorist Oskar Loorits, while musically they are considered a fusion between authentic Livonian folk music and jazz.

Members
 Julgī Stalte – vocals
 Alari Piispea – bass guitar
 Tiit Kikas – fiddle
 Meelis Unt – saxophone
 Jaan Sööt – guitar, kannel
 Tiit Kevad – drums
 Toomas Rull – percussion
 Toomas Lunge – keyboards, accordion, mandolin.

Album

Tuļļi Lum (2000)

Track listing:

Līgõ (Let it be)
Tōți broutšõb Rīgõ (Daddy went to Riga)
Mäd sizār (Our sister)
Astā, veļ, tȭlpa pǟl (Brother, blow your horn)
Joutõmlaps loul (An orphan's song)
Ōra um (It is so rare)
Lōla, izā, lōla, pūoga (Sing, daddy, sing, son)
Jōņ loul (Midsummer's night's song)
Ni kīlmiz (The frost has come)
Sov (Smoke)
Eijõ (Lullaby)

References

External links
 Tuļļi Lum on Myspace

Estonian musical groups
Livonians
Musical groups established in 1999
1999 establishments in Estonia